KXXN (branded as "Big Country 97.5") is a radio station serving Wichita Falls, Texas and Vicinity with a Classic Country format. The station previously operated on 96.3 FM and aired a Regional Mexican music format as "La Ley 96.3." Prior to that, the station was urban adult contemporary "K 96.3 Jamz." KXXN moved to 97.5 FM on February 1, 2018. The station is owned by Falls Media, LLC, which also owns "100.9 Jack-FM" KWFB in Wichita Falls.

References

External links

Classic country radio stations in the United States
XXN
Radio stations established in 2009
2009 establishments in Texas